Arbell  is a surname. Notable people with the surname include: 

Lucy Arbell  (1878–1947), French mezzo-soprano
Michal Arbell-Tor (born 1955), Israeli literature researcher and academic

See also
Abell (surname)
Abrell